Zahid Valencia (born November 5, 1997) is an American freestyle wrestler and graduated folkstyle wrestler who competes at 86 kilograms. As a folkstyle wrestler, he was a two-time NCAA Division I National Champion and three-time Pac-12 Conference champion out of the Arizona State University. In freestyle, he was the 2019 US National Champion and has competed at multiple international tournaments, winning gold at the Matteo Pellicone Ranking Series 2021 and the 2021 Poland Open and bronze at the Grand Prix de France Henri Deglane 2021.

Folkstyle career

High school 
Zahid attended St. John Bosco High School along with his brother Anthony and Aaron Pico. A three-time CIF state champion, Valencia won four Walsh Jesuit Ironman titles and placed third in the state as a sophomore, while wrestling with a broken ankle. His setback at the state tournament was the only one in his high school career, compiling 158 wins with 100 pins and 12 technical falls. When he graduated, Valencia was awarded the Dave Schultz High School Excellence Award and was rated one of the top-five recruits by multiple outlets.

College 
In June 2014, the Valencia brothers announced that they had committed to the Arizona State Sun Devils, competing in the NCAA Division I level.

2015–2016 
As a redshirt athlete, Valencia compiled eight wins and two losses in two tournaments, one loss was handed by graduated Penn State legend and two-time Dan Hodge Trophy winner David Taylor (TF), and the other one by returning All-American Hayden Zillmer (3–4), placing seventh at the Midland Championships. He also claimed the Edinboro Open title.

2016–2017 
Valencia had one of the most dominant freshman campaigns in the history of the school. During regular season, he racked up titles from the Midlands Championships, the Cliff Keen Las Vegas Invite, the Journeyman Collegiate Classic and the Daktronics Open, went 14–0 in dual meets and compiled an overall undefeated record of 31–0. At the Pac-12 Championships, he defeated two opponents, including the fastest pin of the tournament (16 seconds) and was named the Outstanding Wrestler. Entering the NCAA's as the undefeated top-seed, Valencia got three wins (including one over Myles Amine) to make the semifinals, where he suffered his only loss of the season, handed by Mark Hall from Penn State. After his title run was derailed, Valencia got two more victories to claim third-place and capture All-American honors. Once the season was over, Valencia was named the Pac-12 Wrestler and Freshman of the Year (first ever to obtain both honors), and the Sun Devil Most Outstanding Wrestler.

2017–2018 
As a sophomore, Valencia claimed titles from the Cliff Keen Invitational (named OW) and the Midlands Championships, and compiled a 25–0 record during regular season. In the post-season, he claimed his second straight Pac-12 Conference title, and entered the NCAA's as the top-seed for the second year straight. At the NCAA championships, Valencia reached the semifinals with two pins and a major decision, where he defeated returning All-American Myles Amine by decision to make the finals. In the finale, he defeated his rival and the returning NCAA champion Mark Hall, who denied Valencia the title opportunity the previous year, on points (8–2), to become the eleventh Sun Devil to claim an NCAA title. After the season, Valencia was named the Pac-12 Wrestler of the Year, marking the first time a wrestler has earned back-to-back honors since Eric Larkin ('01–'03).

2018–2019 
In his junior year, Valencia claimed titles from the Bison Open, the Cougar Clash and also his third consecutive Midlands title. This season marked the first and second times he had been defeated during regular season, as he was first beaten by rival Mark Hall (0-4) and was then shockingly pinned by Daniel Lewis from Missouri, going 13–2 in duals and 24-2 overall. At the Pac-12 Championships, Valencia recorded two dominant technical falls to claim his third straight title and was named the OW. At the NCAA championships, Valencia, the third seed, made his way to his second final with a pin and three major decisions, while also dominantly avenging his regular season loss to Daniel Lewis. In the finale, he once again faced his nemesis Mark Hall, whom he was able to edge by a point and deny him the title for the second time, claiming his second NCAA title and avenging his other loss during regular season. After the season, Valencia was named the Pac-12 Wrestler of the Year for the third time.

2019–2020 
As a senior, Valencia moved up from 174 to 184 pounds, claimed titles from the Journeyman Collegiate Classic and the Cliff Keen Invitational, and was racking up an undefeated 12–0 record in dual meets (20-0 overall). On February, Valencia tested positive to a recreational substance from the Matteo Pellicone (freestyle), and was subsequently suspended by the ASU wrestling team, which ended up officially finishing his career as a folkstyle wrestler.

During his collegiate years, Valencia became a two-time NCAA Division I National Champion, a three-time All-American, a three-time Pac-12 Conference title holder and a three-time Pac-12 Wrestler of the Year.

Freestyle career

Age-group 
As a junior, Valencia was a three-time US World Team Member and National Champion, and placed tenth, seventh and second respectively at the World Championships. He also competed at the '16 Beat the Streets dual against Mojtaba Goleij, where he was beaten. He was a two-time Fargo National Champion in the cadet level.

Senior level

2015–2016 
Valencia made his senior level debut at the Grand Prix of Spain on July 11, 2015, where he was able to place second after racking up numerous victories over international opponents. He came back later at the Bill Farrell Memorial International, but was unable to place, going out with three victories and two losses. To close off 2015, Valencia went 2–2 at the US Senior Nationals. In January 2016, Valencia went 0–2 at the Dave Schultz Memorial International.

2018–2020 
Valencia came back to the freestyle scene in big fashion after his '18 NCAA championship run, at the US World Team Trials of May 2018. In the WTT Challenge tournament, he opened up with a 10–0 technical fall over two-time ACC champion Josh Asper, and shook three-time NCAA Division I champion Alex Dieringer twice, downing him 7–0 and 5–1 respectively. At Final X, he took on the eventual '18 World Champion and four–time NCAA champion Kyle Dake, whom he was defeated by 0–4 and 3–4.

After one year of inactivity in freestyle, Valencia once again competed at the US World Team Trials Challenge in May 2019. In the first round, he earned a tech fall over Geno Morelli, and a perfect 5–0 victory over his collegiate rival Mark Hall in the semifinals. In the best-of-three, he once again faced Alex Dieringer, but was dominantly defeated twice my him.

In December 2019, Valencia moved up from 79 kilos to 86 kilos and claimed his first US National title at the Senior Nationals of Fort Worth, Texas. In this tournament, he claimed notable wins over Nate Jackson, Aaron Brooks and Myles Martin.

He came back a month later at the 2020 Matteo Pellicone Ranking Series of January, in Italy. He racked up wins over '18 World Championship runner-up Fatih Erdin and avenged his losses to Alex Dieringer to claim the title. However, it was announced on February that Valencia had been disqualified due to a failed drug test, where he tested positive to a banned, recreational substance. This also caused his suspension from the ASU wrestling team.

Valencia was scheduled to wrestle at the '20 US Olympic Team Trials on April 4–5 at State College, Pennsylvania. However, the event was postponed along with the 2020 Summer Olympics due to the COVID-19 pandemic. Both competitions are now scheduled to take place in 2021.

Valencia headlined FloWrestling: Burroughs vs. Valencia on November 14, 2020, against '12 Olympic Gold medalist and four-time World Champion (at 74 kg) Jordan Burroughs, at a catchweight of 185 pounds. At the weigh-ins, Burroughs weighed 178.2 pounds, while Valencia marked 184.1 pounds on the scale. After a perfect 4–0 first period lead, Valencia was bombed with four takedowns while only earning one step-out, which was enough for the smaller athlete to claim the victory.

2021 
To start off the year, Valencia competed at the Henri Deglane Grand Prix of France on January 16. First, he drove the accomplished Russian Magomed Ramazanov to a back-and-forth match, which he ended up losing seven points to eight. In the consolation bracket, he claimed three straight victories to claim bronze, with a notable technical fall over '12 Olympic bronze medalist and two-time European Champion Dato Marsagishvili in the last match.

Valencia then wrestled at the prestigious UWW Matteo Pellicone Ranking Series on March 7. After two technical falls, one of which was over '18 World Championship runner-up Fatih Erdin, Valencia proved his improved skills against long-time rival and multiple–time age–group World Champion Mark Hall, earning a flawless technical fall to claim the gold medal.

Valencia competed at the rescheduled US Olympic Team Trials on April 2–3 as the second seed, in an attempt to represent the United States at the 2020 Summer Olympics. After defeating reigning NCAA champion Aaron Brooks, he was downed by 2019 U23 World Champion Bo Nickal, before coming back to beat Nate Jackson and Pat Downey.

Valencia came back at the prestigious Poland Open on June 8, where he racked up notable and dominant wins over '19 World Championship silver medalist from India Deepak Punia, '20 European Championship silver medalist from San Marino Myles Amine and '21 European Championship silver medalist from Georgia Sandro Aminashvili en route to the gold medal.

Freestyle record 

! colspan="7"| Senior Freestyle Matches
|-
!  Res.
!  Record
!  Opponent
!  Score
!  Date
!  Event
!  Location
|-
! style=background:white colspan=7 |
|-
|Loss
|41–17
|align=left| David Taylor
|style="font-size:88%"|TF 0–10
|style="font-size:88%" rowspan=2|June 8, 2022
|style="font-size:88%" rowspan=2|2022 Final X NYC
|style="text-align:left;font-size:88%;" rowspan=2| New York City, New York
|-
|Loss
|41–16
|align=left| David Taylor
|style="font-size:88%"|2–4
|-
! style=background:white colspan=7 |
|-
|Win
|41–15
|align=left| Lázaro Hernández Luis
|style="font-size:88%"|4–1
|style="font-size:88%" rowspan=3|May 8, 2022
|style="font-size:88%" rowspan=3|2022 Pan American Continental Championships
|style="text-align:left;font-size:88%;" rowspan=3| Acapulco, Mexico
|-
|Win
|40–15
|align=left| Carlos Izquierdo
|style="font-size:88%"|TF 14–4
|-
|Win
|39–15
|align=left| Christian Anguiano
|style="font-size:88%"|TF 11–0
|-
|Win
|38–15
|align=left| Noel Torres
|style="font-size:88%"|TF 10–0
|style="font-size:88%"|February 13, 2022
|style="font-size:88%"|2022 Bout at the Ballpark
|style="text-align:left;font-size:88%;"|
 Arlington, Texas
|-
! style=background:white colspan=7 | 
|-
|Win
|37–15
|align=left| Omar Ziyaudinov
|style="font-size:88%"|TF 10–0
|style="font-size:88%" rowspan=4|January 27–30, 2022
|style="font-size:88%" rowspan=4|Golden Grand Prix Ivan Yarygin 2022
|style="text-align:left;font-size:88%;" rowspan=4|
 Krasnoyarsk, Russia
|-
|Loss
|36–15
|align=left| Amanula Rasulov
|style="font-size:88%"|2–5
|-
|Win
|36–14
|align=left| Azamat Dauletbekov
|style="font-size:88%"|2–2
|-
|Win
|35–14
|align=left| Babuli Tsoloev
|style="font-size:88%"|11–2
|-
! style=background:white colspan=7 |
|-
|Win
|34–14
|align=left| Sandro Aminashvili
|style="font-size:88%"|TF 10–0
|style="font-size:88%" rowspan=4|June 8, 2021
|style="font-size:88%" rowspan=4|2021 Poland Open
|style="text-align:left;font-size:88%;" rowspan=4|
 Warsaw, Poland
|-
|Win
|33–14
|align=left| Myles Amine
|style="font-size:88%"|7–1
|-
|Win
|
|align=left| Deepak Punia
|style="font-size:88%"|INJ
|-
|Win
|32–14
|align=left| Sebastian Jezierzański
|style="font-size:88%"|6–5
|-
! style=background:white colspan=7 |
|-
|Win
|31–14
|align=left| Pat Downey
|style="font-size:88%"|TF 11–1
|style="font-size:88%" rowspan=4|April 2–3, 2021
|style="font-size:88%" rowspan=4|2020 US Olympic Team Trials
|style="text-align:left;font-size:88%;" rowspan=4| Fort Worth, Texas
|-
|Win
|30–14
|align=left| Nate Jackson
|style="font-size:88%"|TF 10–0
|-
|Loss
|29–14
|align=left| Bo Nickal
|style="font-size:88%"|5–12
|-
|Win
|29–13
|align=left| Aaron Brooks
|style="font-size:88%"|6–3
|-
! style=background:white colspan=7 | 
|-
|Win 
|28–13
|align=left| Mark Hall
|style="font-size:88%"|TF 11–0
|style="font-size:88%" rowspan=3|March 7, 2021
|style="font-size:88%" rowspan=3|Matteo Pellicone Ranking Series 2021
|style="text-align:left;font-size:88%;" rowspan=3|
 Rome, Italy
|-
|Win 
|27–13
|align=left| Fatih Erdin
|style="font-size:88%"|TF 12–2
|-
|Win 
|26–13
|align=left| Yeskali Dauletkazy
|style="font-size:88%"|TF 11–1
|-
! style=background:white colspan=7 | 
|-
|Win
|25–13
|align=left| Dato Marsagishvili
|style="font-size:88%"|TF 10–0
|style="font-size:88%" rowspan=4|January 16, 2021
|style="font-size:88%" rowspan=4|Grand Prix de France Henri Deglane 2021
|style="text-align:left;font-size:88%;" rowspan=4|
 Nice, France
|-
|Win
|24–13
|align=left| Damian Iglesias
|style="font-size:88%"|TF 10–0
|-
|Win
|23–13
|align=left| Andrian Grosul
|style="font-size:88%"|TF 13–2
|-
|Loss
|22–13
|align=left| Magomed Ramazanov
|style="font-size:88%"|7–8
|-
|Loss
|22–12
|align=left| Jordan Burroughs
|style="font-size:88%"|5–8
|style="font-size:88%"|November 14, 2020
|style="font-size:88%"|FloWrestling: Burroughs vs. Valencia
|style="text-align:left;font-size:88%;" |
 Austin, Texas
|-
! style=background:white colspan=7 |
|-
|Win
|22–11
|align=left| Alex Dieringer
|style="font-size:88%"|7–5
|style="font-size:88%" rowspan=3|January 15–18, 2020 
|style="font-size:88%" rowspan=3|Matteo Pellicone Ranking Series 2020
|style="text-align:left;font-size:88%;" rowspan=3|
 Rome, Italy
|-
|Win
|21–11
|align=left| Fatih Erdin
|style="font-size:88%"|TF 10–0
|-
|Win
|20–11
|align=left| William Raffi
|style="font-size:88%"|TF 11–1
|-
! style=background:white colspan=7 |
|-
|Win
|19–11
|align=left| Myles Martin
|style="font-size:88%"|7–5
|style="font-size:88%" rowspan=5|December 20–22, 2019
|style="font-size:88%" rowspan=5|2019 Senior Nationals - US Olympic Trials Qualifier
|style="text-align:left;font-size:88%;" rowspan=5|
 Fort Worth, Texas
|-
|Win
|18–11
|align=left| Aaron Brooks
|style="font-size:88%"|6–0
|-
|Win
|17–11
|align=left| Nate Jackson
|style="font-size:88%"|3–2
|-
|Win
|16–11
|align=left| Syed Ul-Hasan
|style="font-size:88%"|TF 10–0
|-
|Win
|15–11
|align=left| Jeff Palmeri
|style="font-size:88%"|TF 14–3
|-
! style=background:white colspan=7 |
|-
|Loss
|14–11
|align=left| Alex Dieringer
|style="font-size:88%"|TF 2–12
|style="font-size:88%" rowspan=4|May 17–19, 2019
|style="font-size:88%" rowspan=4|2019 US World Team Trials Challenge
|style="text-align:left;font-size:88%;" rowspan=4|
 Raleigh, North Dakota
|-
|Loss
|14–10
|align=left| Alex Dieringer
|style="font-size:88%"|TF 1–12
|-
|Win
|14–9
|align=left| Mark Hall
|style="font-size:88%"|5–0
|-
|Win
|13–9
|align=left| Geno Morelli
|style="font-size:88%"|TF 10–0
|-
! style=background:white colspan=7 |
|-
|Loss
|12–9
|align=left| Kyle Dake
|style="font-size:88%"|3–4
|style="font-size:88%" rowspan=2|July 15–16, 2018
|style="font-size:88%" rowspan=2|2018 Final X: State College
|style="text-align:left;font-size:88%;" rowspan=2|
 State College, Pennsylvania
|-
|Loss
|12–8
|align=left| Kyle Dake
|style="font-size:88%"|0–4
|-
|Win
|12–7
|align=left| Alex Dieringer
|style="font-size:88%"|5–1
|style="font-size:88%" rowspan=3|May 18–20, 2018
|style="font-size:88%" rowspan=3|2018 US World Team Trials Challenge
|style="text-align:left;font-size:88%;" rowspan=3|
 Rochester, Minnesota
|-
|Win
|11–7
|align=left| Alex Dieringer
|style="font-size:88%"|7–0
|-
|Win
|10–7
|align=left| Joshua Asper
|style="font-size:88%"|TF 10–0
|-
! style=background:white colspan=7 |
|-
|Loss
|9–7
|align=left| Victor Terrell
|style="font-size:88%"|TF 0–11
|style="font-size:88%" rowspan=2|January 28–30, 2016
|style="font-size:88%" rowspan=2|2016 Dave Schultz Memorial International
|style="text-align:left;font-size:88%;" rowspan=2|
 Colorado Springs, Colorado
|-
|Loss
|9–6
|align=left| Deron Winn
|style="font-size:88%"|TF 0–10
|-
! style=background:white colspan=7 |
|-
|Loss
|9–5
|align=left| Clayton Foster
|style="font-size:88%"|2–8
|style="font-size:88%" rowspan=4|December 17–19, 2015
|style="font-size:88%" rowspan=4|2015 Senior Nationals - US Olympic Trials Qualifier
|style="text-align:left;font-size:88%;" rowspan=4|
 Las Vegas, Nevada
|-
|Win
|9–4
|align=left| Joshua Asper
|style="font-size:88%"|4–4
|-
|Win
|8–4
|align=left| Frank Richmond
|style="font-size:88%"|4–4
|-
|Loss
|7–4
|align=left| Keith Gavin
|style="font-size:88%"|TF 2–13
|-
! style=background:white colspan=7 |
|-
|Loss
|7–3
|align=left| Tyler Caldwell
|style="font-size:88%"|1–5
|style="font-size:88%" rowspan=5|November 5–7, 2015
|style="font-size:88%" rowspan=5|2015 Bill Farrell International Open
|style="text-align:left;font-size:88%;" rowspan=5|
 New York City, New York
|-
|Win
|7–2
|align=left| Timmy McCall
|style="font-size:88%"|2–1
|-
|Win
|6–2
|align=left| Matthew Miller
|style="font-size:88%"|Fall
|-
|Loss
|5–2
|align=left| Robert Hamlin
|style="font-size:88%"|3–7
|-
|Win
|5–1
|align=left| Grayson St-Laurent
|style="font-size:88%"|TF 10–0
|-
! style=background:white colspan=7 |
|-
|Loss
|4–1
|align=left| Taimuraz Friev
|style="font-size:88%"|2–7
|style="font-size:88%" rowspan=5|July 11, 2015
|style="font-size:88%" rowspan=5|2015 Grand Prix of Spain
|style="text-align:left;font-size:88%;" rowspan=5|
 Madrid, Spain
|-
|Win
|4–0
|align=left| Jasmit Phulka
|style="font-size:88%"|TF 10–0
|-
|Win
|3–0
|align=left| Vahid Shahmohammadiizad
|style="font-size:88%"|4–4
|-
|Win
|2–0
|align=left| Simone Iannattoni
|style="font-size:88%"|TF 11–0
|-
|Win
|1–0
|align=left| Shirai Shota
|style="font-size:88%"|8–4
|-

NCAA record 

! colspan="8"| NCAA Championships Matches
|-
!  Res.
!  Record
!  Opponent
!  Score
!  Date
!  Event
|-
! style=background:white colspan=6 |2019 NCAA Championships  at 174 lbs
|-
|Win
|15-1
|align=left|Mark Hall
|style="font-size:88%"|4-3
|style="font-size:88%" rowspan=5|March 21–23, 2019
|style="font-size:88%" rowspan=5|2019 NCAA Division I Wrestling Championships
|-
|Win
|14–1
|align=left|Daniel Lewis
|style="font-size:88%"|MD 11-3
|-
|Win
|13–1
|align=left|Ben Harvey
|style="font-size:88%"|Fall
|-
|Win
|12–1
|align=left|Kimball Bastian
|style="font-size:88%"|MD 16-5
|-
|Win
|11–1
|align=left|Dean Sherry
|style="font-size:88%"|MD 11–2
|-
! style=background:white colspan=6 |2018 NCAA Championships  at 174 lbs
|-
|Win
|10–1
|align=left|Mark Hall
|style="font-size:88%"|8-2
|style="font-size:88%" rowspan=5|March 15–17, 2018
|style="font-size:88%" rowspan=5|2018 NCAA Division I Wrestling Championships
|-
|Win
|9–1
|align=left|Myles Amine 
|style="font-size:88%"|7-5
|-
|Win
|8–1
|align=left|Jadaen Bernstein
|style="font-size:88%"|Fall
|-
|Win
|7–1
|align=left|Christian Brucki
|style="font-size:88%"|MD 18-5
|-
|Win
|6–1
|align=left|Matt Finesilver
|style="font-size:88%"|MD 14-4
|-
! style=background:white colspan=6 |2017 NCAA Championships  at 174 lbs
|-
|Win
|5–1
|align=left|Myles Amine
|style="font-size:88%"|MD 15-5
|style="font-size:88%" rowspan=6|March 16–18, 2017
|style="font-size:88%" rowspan=6|2017 NCAA Division I Wrestling Championships
|-
|Win
|4-1
|align=left|Zac Brunson
|style="font-size:88%"|Fall
|-
|Loss
|3-1
|align=left|Mark Hall
|style="font-size:88%"|3-4
|-
|Win
|3-0
|align=left|Myles Amine
|style="font-size:88%"|14-8
|-
|Win
|2–0
|align=left|Christian Brucki
|style="font-size:88%"|MD 12-3
|-
|Win
|1–0
|align=left|Christopher Pfarr
|style="font-size:88%"|MD 19-5
|-

Stats 

!  Season
!  Year
!  School
!  Rank
!  Weigh Class
!  Record
!  Win
!  Bonus
|-
|2020
|Senior
|rowspan=4|Arizona State University
|#1 (DNQ)
|184
|20-0
|100.00%
|85.00%
|-
|2019
|Junior
|#2 (1st)
|rowspan=3|174
|31-2
|93.94%
|78.79%
|-
|2018
|Sophomore
|#1 (1st)
|32-0
|100.00%
|78.13%
|-
|2017
|Freshman
|#1 (3rd)
|38-1
|97.44%
|71.79%
|-
|colspan=5 bgcolor="LIGHTGREY"|Career
|bgcolor="LIGHTGREY"|121-3
|bgcolor="LIGHTGREY"|97.85%
|bgcolor="LIGHTGREY"|78.43%

References

External links 
 

1997 births
Living people
American male sport wrestlers
Arizona State Sun Devils wrestlers
Arizona State University alumni
People from Bellflower, California
Sportspeople from California
Amateur wrestlers
21st-century American people